Lithops pseudotruncatella is a species of succulent in the family Aizoaceae. It is often confused with Conophytum truncatum, but with attention to detail, it can be distinguished. This confusion associated with L. pseudotruncatella is also where it derives its name, literally meaning "fake-truncatum" ( referring to C. trunctatum). It also received The Royal Horticultural Society's Award of Garden Merit. The plant is found throughout much of Southern Africa.

Description 
Leaves are thick, and similar to that of the rest of the genus Lithops. The leaves are paired in twos, and the plant as a whole does not grow larger than 5 cm in height. They are grey to green in color with branched marbling on the top. Its flowers are yellow in color and not more than 4 cm in diameter.

References 

pseudotruncatella
Taxa named by Alwin Berger
Taxa named by N. E. Brown